Nationality words link to articles with information on the nation's poetry or literature (for instance, Irish or France).

Events

1151:
 Shika Wakashū, a Japanese imperial poetry anthology, begun
 jongleur Palla at the Burgos court of Alfonso VII of León

Works published
1150:
 Geoffrey of Monmouth's Vita Merlini, an adoption of the Welsh tales of Merlin (approx.)

1154:
 Shika Wakashū, a Japanese imperial poetry anthology, completed

1155:
 Roman de Brut by Wace (approx.)
 Ensenhamen de la donzela by Garin lo Brun (poss.)

1157:
 The Kakawin Bhāratayuddha, a Javanese retelling of stories from the Mahabharata

Births
Death years link to the corresponding "[year] in poetry" article. There are conflicting or unreliable sources for the birth years of many people born in this period; where sources conflict, the poet is listed again and the conflict is noted:

1150:
 Folquet de Marselha (died 1231), Occitan troubadour
 Dalfi d'Alvernha (died 1234/1235), Count, troubadour and patron of troubadours 
 Conon de Béthune (died 1219), crusader and trouvère

1153:
 Kamo no Chōmei (died 1216), Japanese author, poet (waka), and essayist

1154:
 Benoît de Sainte-Maure (died 1173), Anglo-Norman poet

1155:
 Jiang Kui (died 1221), Chinese poet, composer and calligrapher of the Song Dynasty
 Jien (died 1225), Japanese poet, historian, and Buddhist monk
 William I of Baux (died 1218), French nobleman and troubadour

1157:
 Alfonso II of Aragon (died 1196), an Occitan troubadour
 Richard I of England (died 1199), Poitevin and Occitan poet

1158:
 Fujiwara no Ietaka (died 1237), Japanese Kamakura period waka poet

Deaths
Birth years link to the corresponding "[year] in poetry" article:

1151:
 Li Qingzhao (born 1084), Chinese writer and poet of the Song Dynasty

1155:
 Geoffrey of Monmouth (born 1100), British clergyman whose Latin writings included early versions of the Merlin (King Arthur) epic

1156:
Garin lo Brun (born unknown), early Auvergnat troubadour

1157:
 Falaki Shirvani (born 1107), Persian

See also

 Poetry
 12th century in poetry
 12th century in literature
 List of years in poetry

Other events:
 Other events of the 12th century
 Other events of the 13th century

12th century:
 12th century in poetry
 12th century in literature

Notes

12th-century poetry
Poetry